Víctor Alfredo Polay Campos (born 6 April 1951) is one of the founders of the Túpac Amaru Revolutionary Movement, a Peruvian Marxist–Leninist terrorist organization that fought in the internal conflict in Peru.  He is currently imprisoned in Callao Naval Base with Vladimiro Montesinos.

He was arrested in 1992. In 1997, the UN Human Rights Committee has found that the circumstances of his trial and detention violated articles 7, 10 and 14 of the ICCPR.

On 22 March 2006 he was found guilty by a Peruvian court on nearly 30 crimes committed during the late 1980s and early 1990 and was sentenced to 32 years imprisonment.

Family
Polay was the son of Victor Polay-Risco, who was part of the founding generation of the Peruvian Aprista Party. Polay-Risco is half-Chinese; his father, Po Leysen, was a Chinese coolie who arrived to work in the Trujillo sugarcane plantations.

References

Bibliography
 

1951 births
Internal conflict in Peru
Living people
Anti-revisionists
Peruvian communists
Peruvian people of Chinese descent
Peruvian prisoners and detainees
Peruvian revolutionaries
Prisoners and detainees of Peru
United Nations Human Rights Committee case law
Prisoners in San Lorenzo Island